The women's 200 metres at the 1950 European Athletics Championships was held in Brussels, Belgium, at Stade du Heysel on 26 and 27 August 1950.

Medalists

Results

Final
27 August
Wind: -0.6 m/s

Heats
26 August

Heat 1
Wind: 1.9 m/s

Heat 2
Wind: 0.3 m/s

Heat 3
Wind: 0.8 m/s

Participation
According to an unofficial count, 14 athletes from 6 countries participated in the event.

 (1)
 (2)
 (3)
 (3)
 (3)
 (2)

References

200 metres
200 metres at the European Athletics Championships
Euro